Kilcummin is a beachhead and civil parish on the northern coast of County Mayo in Ireland. Traditionally a fishing community, the Kilcummin area is sparsely populated. The "Tír Sáile - North Mayo Sculpture Trail" and "Tour d'Humbert" tourist route lead through the area. Kilcummin overlooks Killala Bay, the blue flag beach "An Trá nRoss", "Bartra Island" and lies on the opposite shore to Enniscrone and its beach in County Sligo.

Name
Kilcummin is named after the early Irish saint Cuimín, and derives from the Irish Cill Chuimín, meaning "church of Cuimín". Other variants of the Irish spelling (seen on local signage) include "Cilcummin" and "Cill Chummín".

Prior to being named Kilcummin a map of Connaught from the 5th Century indicates that the area was originally known as "Forrac".

History
In Killala, about 10 miles away from Kilcummin, Saint Patrick is said to have founded a church, on which grounds the modern-day Church of Ireland cathedral has been built. The remains of the church of Saint Cuimín (for which the area is named) are still to be found in the local cemetery, along with a holy well at which to this day worshippers come to pray. Saint Cuimín's grave has been lost over the centuries, but it is believed that a group of stones in Kilcummin cemetery once belonged to his tomb.

Kilcummin is noted as the site where a French expedition commanded by General Humbert landed on 22 August 1798, in an attempt to assist Irish rebels during the 1798 rebellion. Humbert commanded three frigates, the Concorde, Franchise, and the Médée altogether carrying 1070 French forces, three cannon, and approximately 3000 muskets.

Gallery

References

Towns and villages in County Mayo